The 1947 LFF Lyga was the 26th season of the LFF Lyga football competition in Lithuania.  It was contested by 10 teams, and Lokomotyvas Kaunas won the championship.

League standings

References
RSSSF

LFF Lyga seasons
1947 in Lithuanian sport
Lith